The  is an all-stations train service in Japan operated by the East Japan Railway Company (JR East) between  in Chiba Prefecture and  in Saitama Prefecture. Shimosa looks like Musashino train, but Musashino train goes from Hachioji or Fuchu-hommachi and Shimosa goes from Shin-Narashino or Kaihimmakuhari.

Service pattern 
Three services operate every day, during the morning and evening rush hours. The timetables for weekdays and weekends are different. As a side note, the morning return train operates a one-stop service after it returns to Kaihimmakuhari, from Kaihimmakuhari to Shin-Narashino.

Route 
The trains to and from  use one of the Musashino Line freight branches, which connects the Musashino Line (Musashi-Urawa Station) and the Tōhoku Main Line (Yono Station). It also use parts of the Keiyo Line, from Minami-Funabashi to Kaihimmakuhari.

Stations served 

 Ōmiya - Musashi-Urawa - Minami-Urawa - Higashi-Urawa - Higashi-Kawaguchi - Minami-Koshigaya - Koshigaya-Laketown - Yoshikawa - Yoshikawaminami - Shim-Misato - Misato - Minami-Nagareyama - Shim-Matsudo - Shin-Yahashira - Higashi-Matsudo - Ichikawaōno - Funabashihōten - Nishi-Funabashi - Minami-Funabashi - Shin-Narashino - Kaihimmakuhari（※）

※ : Only served by the morning train service

Rolling stock 

Services share rolling stock with the Musashino Line and are currently operated by E231-0 series, or E231-900 series 8-car EMUs with longitudinal seating throughout.

Former rolling stock:

Former rolling stock is 8-car 209 series.

See also 
 List of named passenger trains of Japan
Shimōsa Province, the service's namesake
Musashino (train), a similar service linking Ōmiya and the western side of the Musashino Line and also the Chūō Main Line.

References 

Named passenger trains of Japan
East Japan Railway Company
Railway services introduced in 2010
2010 establishments in Japan